The Murderers are Coming (Ubiytsi vikhodyat na dorogu) is a 1942 Soviet war film directed by Vsevolod Pudovkin and Yuri Tarich based on the 1938 play Fear and Misery of the Third Reich by Bertolt Brecht. The film was not allowed to screen by Soviet censors.

Cast
 Mikhail Astangov - Franz
 Boris Blinov - Theo	
 Sofiya Magarill
 Ada Vojtsik - Marta
 Oleg Zhakov
 Olga Zhiznyeva - Clara
 Aleksandr Antonov - Müller, German soldier

External links

1942 films
Mosfilm films
Films based on works by Bertolt Brecht
Films directed by Vsevolod Pudovkin
Soviet black-and-white films
Soviet war films
1942 war films
Soviet World War II films
Russian World War II films
Kazakhstani World War II films
1940s Russian-language films
Soviet-era Kazakhstani films